Laurent Journet (born 5 February 1970) is a French swimmer. He competed in the men's 400 metre individual medley at the 1988 Summer Olympics.

References

External links
 

1970 births
Living people
French male medley swimmers
Olympic swimmers of France
Swimmers at the 1988 Summer Olympics
People from Villemomble
Sportspeople from Seine-Saint-Denis
20th-century French people